A ministry of the diaspora or ministry of expatriates is any governmental agency which is charged with interacting with the nation's emigrants and expatriates in other states.

In countries such as Israel and Syria, the diaspora portfolio is combined with some other portfolio, such as Foreign Affairs or Information, in order to imbue the office with a secondary, diaspora-specific diplomatic role.

List
 Armenia - Ministry of Diaspora
 Azerbaijan - State Committee on Work with Diaspora
 Bangladesh - Ministry of Expatriates
 Canada - Foreign Affairs and International Trade Canada
 Georgia - State Ministry on Diaspora Affairs
 Greece - Deputy Minister for Diaspora Greeks
 India - Ministry of Overseas Indian Affairs
 Ireland - Minister for Diaspora Affairs
 Israel - Information and Diaspora Ministry
 Mexico - Institute for Mexicans Abroad
 Romania - Ministry for the Romanians Abroad 
 Serbia - Ministry of Religion and Diaspora
 Syria - Minister of Foreign Affairs and Expatriates
 Taiwan - Overseas Community Affairs Council